Predrag Đorović (also transliterated Djorović; born 3 June 1983) is a Serbian football midfielder who plays for Għarb Rangers in Gozo Football League Second Division.

External links
 
 
 

1983 births
Living people
Sportspeople from Mitrovica, Kosovo
Association football midfielders
Serbian footballers
FK Cement Beočin players
FK Javor Ivanjica players
FK Novi Pazar players
FK Metalac Gornji Milanovac players
FK Radnički Nova Pazova players
Serbian SuperLiga players
Serbian expatriate footballers
Serbian expatriate sportspeople in Iceland
Expatriate footballers in Iceland